Exosome component 8, also known as EXOSC8, is a human gene, the protein product of which is part of the exosome complex.

Interactions 

Exosome component 8 has been shown to interact with:
 Exosome component 5  and
 Exosome component 6.

References

Further reading